Leonardo Cortese (24 May 1916 – 31 October 1984) was an Italian film actor and director. He appeared in more than 30 films between 1938 and 1962. He also directed eight films between 1952 and 1967. He was born and died in Rome, Italy.

Selected filmography

 The Widow (1939)
 Father For a Night (1939)
 A Romantic Adventure (1940)
 First Love (1941)
 The Queen of Navarre (1942)
 Happy Days (1942)
 Yes, Madam (1942)
 A Garibaldian in the Convent (1942)
 The Three Pilots (1942)
 Farewell Love! (1943)
 The Ways of Sin (1946)
 Cab Number 13 (1948)
 The Flame That Will Not Die (1949)
 A Night of Fame (1949)
 Feathers in the Wind (1950)
 Song of Spring (1951)
 The Captain of Venice (1951)
 Article 519, Penal Code (1952)
 The Valiant (1962)

Miniseries
 Romeo e Giulietta dir. Franco Enriquez (1954), as Mercuzio
 L'armadietto cinese (1956)
 Il club dei suicidi (1957), from Robert Louis Stevenson.
 Così per gioco as director (1979)

References

External links

1916 births
1984 deaths
Italian male film actors
Italian film directors
Male actors from Rome
Accademia Nazionale di Arte Drammatica Silvio D'Amico alumni
20th-century Italian male actors